Frederick Percy Toms (April 15, 1885 – June 26, 1965) was a Canadian rower who competed in the 1908 Summer Olympics. He was the bowman of the Canadian boat, which won the bronze medal in the coxless pair.

References

External links
profile

1885 births
1965 deaths
Canadian male rowers
Olympic rowers of Canada
Rowers at the 1908 Summer Olympics
Olympic bronze medalists for Canada
Olympic medalists in rowing
Medalists at the 1908 Summer Olympics